Kiryat Yam (lit. One of a group of Haifa suburbs known as the Krayot, it is located on the Mediterranean coast, between Kiryat Haim and the Tzur Shalom industrial area, east of Kiryat Motzkin.

History

The area was acquired by the Jewish community as part of the Sursock Purchase, in which a large tract of land on the Haifa Bay was purchased from the Sursock family of Beirut by the American Zion Commonwealth in 1925. In 1928, the Bayside Land Corporation, a joint venture of the Palestine Economic Corporation and the Jewish National Fund, acquired 2,400 dunams of residential land in a deal related to the building of the IPC oil pipeline. Development of a residential area began in 1939, and the first houses were completed in 1940.

Demographics

Kiryat Yam has a population of 38,945. The northern area of the city is home to many immigrants from the former Soviet Union, North Africa and Ethiopia in which the municipality and its mayor Shmuel Sisso worked to build dozens of centers and homes to help the immigrants settle. The city is ranked medium on the socio-economic scale.

Schools
Kiryat Yam has  15 preschools, eight elementary schools and 3 high schools (Rabin, Rodman & Levinson) with a student population of 10,000.

Israeli-Arab conflict
During the 2006 Lebanon War, Kiryat Yam was hit by Hezbollah rockets and suffered casualties and property damage.

Urban development
Urban development plans aimed at upgrading the old Gimmel neighborhood were blocked by Rafael Advanced Defense Systems, whose main weapons development plant borders Kiryat Yam. In 2009, the Haifa district planning committee approved high-rise construction for the neighborhood, overruling Rafael's objections.

Neighbourhoods
Kiryat Yam  (Dalet) - including Almogim
Kiryat Yam  (Gimmel) - built in the 1950s
Kiryat Yam  (Bet)
Kiryat Yam  (Alef)
Savyoney Yam
Psagot Yam & Bne Beitkha

Notable people

Avner Shats (born 1959), author and poet
Sam Vaknin (born 1961), writer
Orel Grinfeld (born 1981), football referee
Gil Vermouth (born 1985), footballer

Twin towns – sister cities

Kiryat Yam is twinned with:

 Créteil, île-de-France (France)
 Friedrichshain-Kreuzberg, Berlin (Germany)
 Makó (Hungary)
 Poti (Georgia)
 Sighetu Marmației (Romania)

References

Cities in Israel
Krayot
Cities in Haifa District